Ambalappuzha Sree Krishna Swamy Temple is an Indian Hindu temple dedicated to Krishna at Ambalappuzha in Alappuzha district of Kerala. The temple is believed to have been built during 15th century AD by the local ruler Chembakasserry Pooradam Thirunal-Devanarayanan Thampuran. It is one of the seven greatest temples in Travancore.

The idol at Ambalappuzha is likened to Parthasarthi form of Vishnu, holding a whip in his right hand and a conch in his left. During the raids of Tipu Sultan in 1789, the idol of Sri Krishna from the Guruvayoor Temple was brought to the Ambalappuzha Temple for safe keeping for three years.

Payasam, a sweet pudding made of rice and milk is served in the temple and is believed that the Lord Guruvayoorappan visits the temple daily to accept the offering.

Legend

According to the legend, the god Krishna once appeared in the form of a sage in the court of the king who ruled the region and challenged him for a game of chess (or chaturanga). The king being a chess enthusiast himself gladly accepted the invitation. The prize had to be decided before the game and the king asked the sage to choose his prize in case he won. The sage told the king that he had a very modest claim and being a man of few material needs, all he wished was a few grains of rice. The amount of rice itself shall be determined using the chess-board in the following manner. One grain of rice shall be placed in the first square, two grains in the second square, four in the third square, eight in the fourth square, sixteen in fifth square and so on. Every square will have double of its predecessor.

The king lost the game and sage demanded the agreed-upon prize. As he started adding grains of rice to the chess board, the king soon realised the true nature of the sage's demands. The royal granary soon ran out of grains of rice. The king realised that he will never be able to fulfill the promised reward as the number of grains was increasing as a geometric progression and the total amount of rice required for a 64-squared chess board is 18,446,744,073,709,551,615 grains, translating to trillions of tons of rice.

Upon seeing the dilemma, the sage appeared to the king in his true-form and told the king that he did not have to pay the debt immediately but could pay him over time. The king would serve paal-payasam (pudding made of rice) in the temple freely to the pilgrims every day until the debt was paid off.

Festival 
The Amabalapuzha Temple Festival was established during the fifteenth century AD. At this time, central parts of Alappuzha district were ruled by the Chembakassery Devanarayana Dynasty. The rulers of this dynasty were highly religious and decided that an idol of Lord Krishna was to be brought to the Amabalapuzha Sree Krishna Swamy Temple from the Karinkulam temple. The celebration in commemoration of the bringing of this idol of Lord Krishna is the origin of the Amabalapuzha Temple Festival, also referred to as the Chambakulam Moolam water festival. This festival is conducted every year on the Moolam day of the Mithunam month of the Malayalam era. The Aaraattu festival takes place on the Thiruvonam day in March–April.

Gallery

See also

 Ambalappuzha Vijayakrishnan
 Temples of Kerala
 Temple festivals of Kerala

References

External links 
Facts about Ambalapuzha Temple
Ambalapuzha Temple from the book: Temples and Legends of Kerala
Ambalappuzha temple in Google Maps

Krishna temples
Hindu temples in Alappuzha district